James Moss Cardwell (January 17, 1926 – April 11, 1990), who used the pen name Adobe James, was an American writer and educator.

He is best known for his horror stories, such as The Ohio Love Sculpture and The Road to Mictlantecutli, which appeared in anthologies edited by Alfred Hitchcock, Herbert van Thal, and others. He also wrote short stories and articles for men's magazines.

Career
Cardwell was a president of California's Monterey Peninsula College, and a long-standing member of the Diogenes Club, a Sherlock Holmes appreciation society.
His unproduced musical play "Mrs. Hudson?

Cardwell was survived by his third wife, Julie.

Selected bibliography

Short stories
As Adobe James:

 The Ohio Love Sculpture (1963)
 I'll Love You – Always (1964)
 The Revenge (1964)
 Puppetmaster (1965)
 The Road to Mictlantecutli (1965)
 Tomorrow and ... Tomorrow (1967)
 An Apparition at Noon (1968)
 The Spelling Bee (1989)

According to one source Cardwell used another pseudonym, James McArdwell, to write The Green Umbilical Cord (1968).

Play
 "Mrs. Hudson? ... Mrs. Hudson!!" (2000) (published posthumously as James Moss Cardwell)

Influences
Cardwell's editor, Michael Kean, has discussed similarities between Cardwell's 1967 story "Tomorrow and Tomorrow" and Michael Winner's 1974 film Death Wish. Cardwell's 1964 story "The Revenge" closely resembles a 1947 story, "Revenge" – attributed to an otherwise unknown writer, Samuel Blas – which was twice adapted for television's Alfred Hitchcock Presents (in 1955 and 1985), and was also used as a plot in a number of horror comics. However, as Cardwell is not credited for these adaptations, it remains unclear whether these similarities are coincidental.

Notes

References 

American horror writers
1926 births
American male short story writers
1990 deaths
20th-century American short story writers
People from Fort Smith, Arkansas
Writers from Arkansas
Pomona College alumni
20th-century American male writers